Michael 'Mick' O'Bryne (born 7 September 1988) is a Scottish footballer who plays for Rutherglen Glencairn.  He played 'senior' for Dumbarton, Albion Rovers, Livingston, Airdrie, Stirling Albion and Linlithgow Rose.

He signed for Rutherglen Glencairn in 2020 after a spell at Kilbirnie Ladeside.

References

External links 
Soccerbase

1988 births
Scottish footballers
Dumbarton F.C. players
Albion Rovers F.C. players
Livingston F.C. players
Airdrieonians F.C. players
Stirling Albion F.C. players
Linlithgow Rose F.C. players
Kilbirnie Ladeside F.C. players
Rutherglen Glencairn F.C. players
Scottish Football League players
Living people
Scottish Professional Football League players
Association football defenders
Scottish Junior Football Association players